Shahid Shafaat is a Pakistani director, writer, producer and actor who works in television, film and theatre. Mostly known for his work as a director, Shafaat started his on-screen career in the early 2000s and directed more than 10 television plays. He received Lux Style Award nomination as a Best TV Director for Dil Mom Ka Diya.

Career 

Shafaat started his career in theatre. He directed several plays, most notably Main Adakara Banu Gi. He directed the series Kaafir in 2012, which received critical praise, but was a commercial failure. In 2016, he directed Next Level Entertainment's production, Khuda Mera Bhi Hai. The series received critical acclaim. In 2018, he directed Khasara, which was a commercial success. His next play was another Next level Entertainment production, Dil Mom Ka Diya which became the highest-rated play in Pakistani television history. He then ventured in social causes television series, including Surkh Chandni and Bikhray Moti .

Filmography

Film 
 Jhol

Television

References

Pakistani directors
Pakistani writers
Pakistani actors
Pakistani television directors
Living people
Year of birth missing (living people)